Mirza Hassan Khan Esfandiary, also known Hassan Esfandiary (1867–1945), was an Iranian politician and 12th chairman of the Iranian parliament. He became Member of Parliament from Tehran and Mazandaran from 1934 to 1945. He was a minister in several cabinets of Iranian Prime ministers.

External links 

Government ministers of Iran
1947 deaths
1867 births
Speakers of the National Consultative Assembly
Iranian monarchists
People from Nur, Iran
Members of the 10th Iranian Majlis
Members of the 11th Iranian Majlis
Members of the 12th Iranian Majlis
Members of the 13th Iranian Majlis